Ardbraccan House (known sometimes historically as Ardbraccan Palace) is a large Palladian country house in the town of Ardbraccan, County Meath, Ireland. The historic house served from the 1770s to 1885 as the residence of the Church of Ireland Lord Bishop of Meath.

Construction
Ardbraccan itself had been the location of the residence of a Catholic bishop for over one thousand years, first of the Bishop of Ardbraccan and, later, following the merger of many small dioceses into the Diocese of Meath, as the residence of the Bishop of Meath. By the Middle Ages a large Tudor house, containing its own church, known as St. Mary's, stood on the site. However, in 1734, Bishop Arthur Price (1678-1752) decided to replace the decaying mansion with a new Georgian residence. Initially the two wings of the house were built, before the main four-bay two-storey block of the house was completed in the 1770s by Bishop Maxwell. It was partly designed by the acclaimed 18th-century German architect Richard Castle (also known as Richard Cassels), who was the architect of many notable Irish buildings including Leinster House in Dublin.

Controversy/legend
Legend suggested that gravestones from a neighbouring Catholic cemetery at Markiestown, some miles away, were removed and used as the steps into the servants' quarters in the residence. Whether that was an urban myth based on the intense rivalry between the state-established Church of Ireland and the local, predominantly Catholic, population in Bohermeen (who were subject to the discriminatory Penal Laws and forced to pay tithes to the Church of Ireland) or had some basis in fact, is unclear. It is possible that the house utilised stone from the derelict pre-Reformation church at the cemetery, though it was notable that from the mid to late eighteenth century the cemetery was denuded of all gravestones.

Sale
The new bishop's palace became famous for its architecture. Funded by government grants and locally paid tithes, the Church of Ireland bishop held court from the mansion, which was the centre of a large agricultural demesne. However the disestablishment of the Church of Ireland in 1871, following the previous scrapping of Roman Catholic-paid tithes, fatally weakened the economic survival of the bishop's estate, which was left totally reliant on the small local Church of Ireland community, and in 1885 the bishop sold the estate and house, moving to a more suitable smaller mansion nearby named Bishopscourt. Ardbraccan House was bought by the eldest son of Hugh Law, a former Lord Chancellor of Ireland, and remained in the ownership of his descendants until sold by Colonel Owen Foster in 1985 to Tara Mines, who used it as a guest residence for visiting businessmen.

Today
In the late 1990s, the house was bought by David Maher who invested large sums to completely restore the mansion. In 2002 the restoration of Ardbraccan House won An Taisce's Best Restoration of a Private Building award, and it was opened to the public.

In the early 2000s, the (Meath) planning authority approved controversial plans to build a major new motorway linking Clonee and Kells through part of the house's historic demesne. The Irish Georgian Society and environmentalists criticised the proposal. The M3 motorway eventually opened in 2010.

In 2013 the property was sold to Charles Noell.

See also
Bellinter House

References

Houses in County Meath
Palladian architecture in Ireland
Richard Cassels buildings
Houses in the Republic of Ireland